Lake Gribben is a lake in the U.S. state of Michigan, located  southeast of the unincorporated community of Palmer. The lake exhibits a distinct orange hue due to its use as a tailings basin in association with open-pit mining operations of the Empire and Tilden iron mines.

See also
List of lakes in Michigan
Water pollution in the United States

References

Lakes of Michigan
Lakes of Marquette County, Michigan